Emperor is a 2012 American-Japanese historical drama film directed by Peter Webber, marking his first film in five years. Tommy Lee Jones and Matthew Fox star in lead roles as General Douglas MacArthur and Brigadier General Bonner Fellers respectively.

Plot
Brigadier-General Bonner Fellers is sent to Japan as a part of the occupation force. He is tasked with arresting Japanese war criminals, including former Prime Minister Hideki Tojo. Before he departs, he privately orders his Japanese interpreter, Takahashi, to locate his Japanese girlfriend, Aya Shimada.

After arresting Tojo, the Supreme Commander for the Allied Powers, General Douglas MacArthur, informs Fellers that Emperor Hirohito can't be tried as a war criminal. Doing so could lead to a revolt, but the American people want the Emperor to stand trial for Japan's actions. MacArthur gives Fellers ten days to investigate the Emperor. When Takahashi informs Fellers that Aya's Tokyo apartment was bombed, he orders him to investigate her hometown, Shizuoka.

Fellers and his staff compile a list of people who advised Emperor Hirohito when the war started. None of the Japanese who are friendly to the Americans are among them and they resort to Tojo for more information. He gives them the name of Fumimaro Konoe, the former prime minister. Fellers then asks Konoe if the Emperor was responsible for starting the war and Konoe gives no conclusive evidence, but directs Fellers to Kōichi Kido, Lord Keeper of the Privy Seal.

While Fellers waits to meet with Kido, Takahashi informs Fellers Kido will not show up. Fellers soon after recalls his 1940 visit to Tokyo when he reunited with Aya, then an English teacher. He learns Aya returned to Japan after her father became ill and died. After a banquet at MacArthur's residence, Takahashi informs Fellers that Shizuoka was bombed; Fellers immediately travels there. He is devastated by the damage and orders Takahashi to find a list of the dead.

Fellers recalls his visit to Aya's uncle, General Kajima, for help with a paper on the mindset of the Japanese soldier. Kajima insists if the United States and Japan were at war, the Japanese would win because of the Japanese soldier's sense of duty to the Emperor. When Fellers returns to Tokyo, he decides he must interview Teizaburō Sekiya, a member of the Privy Council. Sekiya, like Konoe, does not give any evidence to exonerate the Emperor.

Kido unexpectedly arrives in the middle of the night to be interviewed by Fellers. Recalling the time before the Japanese surrender, Kido tells of the Supreme Council's deadlock between those in favor of surrender and those who were not led the Emperor to address the Council. Because there were radical militarists in the Imperial Army, the Emperor made an audio recording of his order to surrender.

Before the recording could be broadcast, the militarists attempted a coup and attacked the Imperial Palace. The Emperor and Kido survived and broadcast the recording. Unfortunately for Fellers, the other witnesses committed suicide and all records were destroyed, leaving him only with Kido's testimony. Kido informs Fellers the Emperor's role is, in actuality, a ceremonial one and the Emperor was influential in ending the war.

Fellers decides to visit General Kajima, who has survived the war. Kajima explains to Fellers that the Japanese people are selfless and capable of great sacrifice as well as unspeakable crimes because of their strong devotion to their cultural values. Kajima does not know if the Emperor is guilty, but he notes his role in ending the war. He gives Fellers a box of folded letters written by Aya to Fellers and Fellers learns that Aya died in an Allied bombing raid.

Fellers concludes it cannot be determined whether the Emperor is guilty or innocent, but his role in ending the war was significant. He gives his conclusion to MacArthur, who is displeased because of the lack of conclusive evidence. Fellers argues the Emperor should be exonerated as the Allies agreed they would allow Japan to keep him as the head of state.

MacArthur orders Fellers to arrange a meeting between him and the Emperor. Before the Emperor arrives, Fellers informs MacArthur of his role in diverting Allied bombers away from Shizuoka. MacArthur replies because no American lives were lost because of it, he will turn a blind eye. When Emperor Hirohito arrives, he offers himself to be punished rather than Japan. MacArthur states he has no intention of punishing Japan or Hirohito and wishes to discuss Japan's reconstruction.

Cast

Production
Principal photography began shooting in January 2012 in New Zealand.

Scenes used were shot on location at RNZAF Base Whenuapai and some Air Force personnel used as extras for the movie.

Release
The film premiered at the 2012 Toronto International Film Festival and saw a limited release in the United States on March 8, 2013. Producer Gary Foster, Matthew Fox and Tommy Lee Jones attended a Japanese premiere along with several Japanese actors and actresses on July 18, 2013, preceding its opening in the cinemas nationwide in Japan on July 27.

Reception
The film received mostly negative reviews, with only a 31% rating based on 86 reviews at the film review aggregator Rotten Tomatoes, with the consensus: "Despite a typically strong performance from Tommy Lee Jones, Emperor does little with its fascinating historical palate, and is instead bogged down in a clichéd romantic subplot".

See also
 The Sun, Alexander Sokurov's 2005 film on the same subject

References

External links
 
 
 
 

2012 films
2010s historical drama films
2012 war drama films
American historical drama films
American war drama films
Pacific War films
Japanese historical drama films
Japanese war drama films
English-language Japanese films
2010s Japanese-language films
American multilingual films
Japanese multilingual films
Films set in Japan
Films about the United States Army
Films scored by Alex Heffes
Films set in Tokyo
Films shot in Japan
Films shot in New Zealand
Films shot in Tokyo
Shochiku films
Lionsgate films
Roadside Attractions films
Films set in 1945
Films set in 1946
Films about Douglas MacArthur
Cultural depictions of Hideki Tojo
Cultural depictions of Hirohito
2012 drama films
Japan in non-Japanese culture
Films directed by Peter Webber
American World War II films
Japanese World War II films
Empire of Japan
2010s English-language films
2010s American films